The NBN-3 Tournament was a professional golf tournament held in 1970 at the Merewether Golf Club in Newcastle, New South Wales, Australia. Total prize money was A$10,000. The event was sponsored by NBN-3, a television station based in Newcastle.

Kel Nagle won by a stroke from Walter Godfrey and Peter Thomson. Bill Dunk had a final round of 60, making birdies at the last 7 holes.

Winners

References

Golf tournaments in Australia
Golf in New South Wales
Sport in Newcastle, New South Wales